Bill Ward (30 March 1901 – 24 April 1969) was an  Australian rules footballer who played with St Kilda in the Victorian Football League (VFL).

Notes

External links 

1901 births
1969 deaths
Australian rules footballers from Victoria (Australia)
St Kilda Football Club players
Brighton Football Club players